Prosthenorchis is a genus of parasitic worms belonging to the family Oligacanthorhynchidae.

The species of this genus are found in America.

Species:

Prosthenorchis cerdocyonis 
Prosthenorchis elegans 
Prosthenorchis fraterna 
Prosthenorchis lemuri 
Prosthenorchis sinicus

References

Archiacanthocephala
Acanthocephala genera